The 1936 Holy Cross Crusaders football team represented the College of the Holy Cross during the 1936 college football season. The Crusaders were led by fourth-year head coach Eddie Anderson and played their home games at Fitton Field on campus in Worcester, Massachusetts. The team competed as a football independent. Holy Cross started the year on a five game winning streak, which helped land them a spot in the first ever AP Poll, released on October 19, 1936, being ranked 17th in that poll. Losses to Temple and rival Boston College and a tie to Saint Anselm knocked the Crusaders out of the polls by the end of the year. The team finished with an overall record of 7–2–1.

Schedule

Rankings

References

Holy Cross
Holy Cross Crusaders football seasons
Holy Cross Crusaders football